Thomas A. Edison High School is a public high school serving the Monte Vista Historic District of San Antonio, Texas, United States.
Thomas Edison High School has an enrollment of approximately 1700 students, with a faculty to student ratio of 16.75. It is in the San Antonio Independent School District.

In 2015, the school was rated "Met Standard" by the Texas Education Agency.

History
Edison High School was opened in 1929 on what is now the campus for John Greenleaf Whittier Academy at 2101 Edison Drive, San Antonio. It was originally a six-year junior-senior school. Increased enrollment and crowded conditions created the need to split the schools into two campuses. In September 1958, grades ten through twelve were moved into the new Edison High School building at 701 Santa Monica street. Grades seven through nine remained in the old building and became the new student body of John Greenleaf Whittier Junior High School. When SAISD moved 9th grade to the high school, John Greenleaf Whittier became a middle school housing grades 6, 7 and 8. In the fall of 2003 students at the junior high moved into temporary facilities next to the school building while new additional construction was completed. The new school opened in August 2007 as Whittier Health Science Academy. The Academy is partnered with the University of Texas Health Science Center in San Antonio.

The school received national attention in 1995 as it was at the center of the case of United States v. Lopez.

Athletics
The Edison Golden Bears compete in the following sports:

 Baseball
 Basketball
 Cross country
 Football
 Golf
 Soccer
 Softball
 Swimming and diving
 Tennis
 Track and field
 Volleyball

Alumni
  Howard Fest (1964), former NFL offensive lineman
 Wade Key (1964), former NFL offensive lineman
 Guido Merkens (1973), former NFL safety, quarterback and wide receiver

References

External links
 Edison High School

High schools in San Antonio
San Antonio Independent School District high schools
1929 establishments in Texas